Antonio Filipe Gonzaga de Aquino (born 8 April 1992), commonly known as Feijão is a Brazilian footballer who plays for Anapolina as a midfielder.

Club career
A product of the youth setup of Esporte Clube Bahia, Feijão was promoted to the senior squad in 2013 following the Copa São Paulo de Futebol Júnior. On 19 September 2013, he scored his first goal for the club in a 2–0 victory over Sport Club Internacional.

On 14 January 2014, Feijão joined Clube de Regatas do Flamengo on a year long loan deal. However, after being sparingly used, he returned to his parent club on 16 April.

Feijão was loaned to Atlético Goianense on a one year deal on 7 July 2015. On 23 November, the loan deal was prematurely terminated by Atlético Goianense.

On 19 January 2018, Feijão joined Clube de Regatas Brasil on a loan deal till the end of the season.

After a spell at Kazma SC in Kuwait, Feijão returned to Brazil in January 2020 and joined Anapolina.

References

External links

1994 births
Living people
Association football midfielders
Brazilian footballers
Brazilian expatriate footballers
Campeonato Brasileiro Série A players
Campeonato Brasileiro Série B players
Esporte Clube Bahia players
CR Flamengo footballers
Atlético Clube Goianiense players
Clube de Regatas Brasil players
Esporte Clube São Bento players
Kazma SC players
Associação Atlética Anapolina players
Brazilian expatriate sportspeople in Kuwait
Expatriate footballers in Kuwait
Kuwait Premier League players
Sportspeople from Salvador, Bahia